John O'Donoghue (born 1942) is a former Irish sportsperson.  He played hurling with his local club Arravale Rovers and with the Tipperary senior inter-county team in the 1960s and 1970s.

Playing career

Club

O'Donoghue played his club hurling with his local Arravale Rovers club in Tipperary town.

Inter-county

O'Donoghue first came to prominence in the late 1950s as a member of the Tipperary minor hurling team.  He won both Munster and All-Ireland at that grade in 1959 and also won a Harty Cup medal with the Abbey School (CBS) in Tipperary Town, the school's only success in the Munster Senior Colleges Hurling Championship.  The following year, O'Donoghue was captain of the minor team when he captured a second Munster minor title.  He later joined the then powerful Tipp senior team, now regarded as one of hurling's most formidable teams in any era. In doing so, he succeeded his fellow West Tipperary man, Dónal O'Brien of Knockavilla Kickhams, who had emigrated to New York. O'Donoghue won his first National Hurling League in 1964.  Later that year O'Donoghue captured his first senior Munster title, as well as his first senior All-Ireland medal.  The following year Tipperary still dominated the hurling scene as O'Donoghue won another set of National League, Munster and All-Ireland honours at senior level.  Two years later in 1967 Tipperary continued their dominance with O'Donoghue capturing a third provincial medal in the process.  Unfortunately, his side were later defeated by Kilkenny in the All-Ireland final.  In 1968 he won a third National league medal and a fourth Munster title, however, Wexford defeated Tipp in the subsequent All-Ireland final which had a dramatic second half which saw Tipp's 10 point interval lead converted to a Wexford win by 2 points.  Two years later, he was substituted in the Munster final against Cork in Limerick, though his defenders were also on an off-day against a rampant Cork team and gave him little of the cover he enjoyed in his early career from the "Hell's Kitchen" crew of John Doyle, Michael Maher and Kieran Carey all of whom had now departed the scene. In 1971 O'Donoghue was relegated as the first-choice goalkeeper, making way for his long-time understudy, Peter O'Sullivan of Cashel King Cormacs. However, he won a fifth and final Munster medal as a substitute against Limerick In Killarney that summer.  He later won his third All-Ireland medal, as a substitute also, following a great win over Kilkenny in a classic final which also marked the retirement from the inter-county scene of his long-time team mate, Jimmy Doyle.

O'Donoghue was back on the Tipperary hurling scene in 1991 when he replaced Theo English as a selector on Babs Keating's management team where Tipperary went on to win the All Ireland that year.

O'Donoghue is also an accomplished golfer, representing Ireland at international level where he won Senior International Caps in 2003 and 2004.

Teams

References

1942 births
Living people
Tipperary inter-county hurlers
Arravale Rovers hurlers
Munster inter-provincial hurlers
Hurling goalkeepers
Hurling selectors
All-Ireland Senior Hurling Championship winners